Logan Martin may refer to:

 Logan Martin (BMX rider) (born 1993), Australian BMX rider
 Logan Martin (footballer) (born 1997), French footballer
 Logan Martin Lake, a reservoir located in Alabama